Concerto of the Greater Sea is a studio album by Australian, multi-instrumentalist and oud virtuoso Joseph Tawadros. The album was self-released in February 2012.

At the ARIA Music Awards of 2012, the album won the ARIA Award for Best World Music Album.

Reception
The Australian said "The dynamic tonal range of Joseph Tawadros's oud, his dazzling technique and articulation are equally evident in both slow and fast sections. The ingenuity of brother James's work on req (Egyptian tambourine) peaks in 'The Procession'. Elsewhere, bendir (frame drum) provides propulsion. Oud, percussion and orchestra set a scorching tempo in Oasis."

Track listing
 "The Greater Sea" - 3:15
 "Rose" - 4:02
 "Twilight of Memory" - 5:28
 "Epiphany" - 2:43
 "Sleepless Mother" - 6:52
 "Boundless" - 4:01
 "Seafarer" - 5:40
 "Oasis" - 6:02
 "The Wind Prelude" - 0:33
 "Heart of Rose" - 4:20
 "The Procession" - 3:18
 "Upon the Wind" - 7:55
 "Ebb And Flow" - 2:20
 "Remember" - 9:01
 "Departure" - 3:10
 "Existence" - 5:30

Personnel
 Joseph Tawadros (Oud)
 Richard Tognetti & The Australian Chamber Orchestra (Violin) 
 James Tawadros (Req', Bendir) 
 Chris Moore (Viola)
 Matt McMahon (Piano)

References 

2012 albums
Joseph Tawadros albums
ARIA Award-winning albums